The Burgundian Circle was an Imperial Circle of the Holy Roman Empire created in 1512 and significantly enlarged in 1548. In addition to the Free County of Burgundy (present-day administrative region of Franche-Comté), the Burgundian Circle roughly covered the Low Countries, i.e., the areas now known as the Netherlands, Belgium and Luxembourg and adjacent parts in the French administrative region of Nord-Pas-de-Calais. For most of its history, its lands were coterminous with the holdings of the Spanish Habsburgs in the Empire (Franche-Comté and the Habsburg Netherlands).

The circle's territorial scope was reduced considerably in the 17th century with the secession of the Seven United Provinces in 1581 (recognized 1648 under the Treaty of Westphalia) and the annexation of the Free County of Burgundy by France in 1678. Consequently, in the 18th century the circle was known as Austrian Netherlands. The occupation and subsequent annexation of Imperial territory to the west of the Rhine river by Revolutionary France in the 1790s effectively brought an end to the circle's existence.

Composition 

After the 1548 Diet of Augsburg, the circle was made up of the following territories:

Seventeen Provinces 
 the Margraviate of Antwerp.
 the County of Artois, ceded by France in 1493, annexed by France in 1659.
 the Duchy of Brabant.
 the County of Flanders.
 the Lordship of Frisia, which seceded to form part of the United Provinces from 1579.
 the Lordship of Groningen which is a grouping of the former Ommelanden, which seceded to form part of the United Provinces from 1579, and the City of Groningen, which joined the United Provinces in 1594.
 the Duchy of Guelders, which, with the exception of Upper Guelders, seceded to form part of the United Provinces from 1579.
 the County of Hainaut.
 the County of Holland, which seceded to form part of the United Provinces from 1579.
 the Duchy of Limburg, held by the Dukes of Brabant.
 the Duchy of Luxembourg.
 the Lordship of Mechelen, a personal lordship of the Duke of Burgundy.
 the County of Namur.
 the Lordship of Overijssel, including the County of Drenthe, which seceded to form part of the United Provinces from 1579.
 the Prince-Bishopric, later Lordship of Utrecht, which seceded to form part of the United Provinces from 1579.
 the County of Zeeland, held by the Counts of Holland; seceded to form part of the United Provinces from 1579.
 the County of Zutphen, held by the Dukes of Guelders; seceded merging with the States of the Guelders from 1579.

County of Burgundy 
 the Free County of Burgundy and
 the Imperial City of Besançon
both annexed by France according to the 1678 Treaty of Nijmegen.
The Prince-bishopric of Liège remained a part of the Lower Rhenish-Westphalian Circle until its dissolution in 1795.

History 
The Imperial Seventeen Provinces emerged from the Burgundian Netherlands ruled in personal union by the French Dukes of Burgundy. Most of them had been fiefs of the Holy Roman Empire on the territory of Lower Lorraine, except for Flanders and Artois. In 1482, they fell to the House of Habsburg.

In 1363, the French king John II of Valois enfeoffed his youngest son Philip the Bold with the Duchy of Burgundy (Bourgogne). Philip in 1369 married Margaret of Dampierre, only child of Count Louis II of Flanders (d. 1384), whose immense dowry not only comprised Flanders and Artois but also the Imperial County of Burgundy. He thereby became the progenitor of the House of Valois-Burgundy who systematically came into possession of different Imperial fiefs: his grandson Philip the Good, Duke of Burgundy from 1419, purchased Namur in 1429, inherited the duchies of Brabant and Limburg from his cousin Philip of Saint-Pol in 1430. In 1432, he forced Jacqueline of Wittelsbach to cede him the counties of Hainaut and Holland with Zeeland according to the Treaty of Delft and finally occupied Luxembourg, exiling Duchess Elisabeth of Görlitz in 1443.

The Burgundian realm then bore a faint resemblance to the early medieval Lotharingia, it however fell suddenly with the death of the ambitious Charles the Bold. In 1473, he had made an agreement with Emperor Frederick III of Habsburg according to which he would marry his daughter Mary the Rich to the Emperor's son Archduke Maximilian I of Austria in exchange for the elevation of his Imperial territories to a "Kingdom of Burgundy", co-equal to the French kingdom of his Valois cousins. The Prince-electors, however, forestalled these plans, and the deprived Duke Charles started a desperate campaign against the Duchy of Lorraine and was killed at the 1477 Battle of Nancy. To secure her heritage against King Louis XI of France, his daughter Mary nevertheless married Maximilian in the same year. The Archduke defeated the French troops at the 1479 Battle of Guinegate and by the 1493 Treaty of Senlis annexed the Seventeen Provinces – including the French fiefs of Flanders and Artois – for the House of Habsburg. The sovereignty finally passed to the Empire in the Treaty of Cambrai in 1529. The Duchy of Burgundy proper was seized as a reverted fief by the French crown.

 
Maximilian's grandson and successor, Emperor Charles V of Habsburg eventually won the Guelders Wars and united all seventeen provinces under his rule, the last one being the Duchy of Guelders in 1543. The Burgundian treaty of 1548 shifted the seventeen provinces from the Lower Rhenish–Westphalian Circle to the Burgundian circle, resulting in a significant territorial gain for the latter and increased tax obligation. The Pragmatic Sanction of 1549 determined that the Provinces should remain united in the future and inherited by the same monarch. After Charles V's abdication in 1556, his realms became divided between his son, King Philip II of Spain, and his brother, Emperor Ferdinand I. The Seventeen Provinces went to his son Philip. Meanwhile, a common political representation was established through the States General of the Netherlands.

Conflicts between Philip II and his Dutch subjects led to the Eighty Years' War, which started in 1568. The seven northern provinces gained their independence as a republic called the Seven United Provinces. They were:

 the Lordship of Groningen and of the Ommelanden
 the Lordship of Friesland
 the Lordship of Overijssel
 the Duchy of Guelders (except its upper quarter) and the county of Zutphen
 the lordship of Utrecht
 the county of Holland
 the county of Zeeland

The southern provinces – Flanders, Brabant, Namur, Hainaut, Luxembourg and so forth – were restored to Spanish rule thanks to the military and political talent of the Duke of Parma, especially at the siege of Antwerp (1584-1585). Hence, these Provinces became known as the Spanish Netherlands or the Southern Netherlands.

The northern Seven United Provinces kept parts of Limburg, Brabant and Flanders during and after the Eighty Years' War (see: Generality Lands), which ended with the Treaty of Westphalia in 1648.

Artois, and parts of Flanders and Hainaut were ceded to France in the treaties of the Pyrenees and Nijmegen in the course of the 17th century.

See also 
 Seventeen Provinces
 Burgundian Netherlands
 Governors of the Habsburg Netherlands
 History of Burgundy
 Kingdom of Burgundy
 Middle Francia
 Spanish Road
 Blue Banana

References

External links 
 Map of the Seventeen Provinces (1555)

 

Circles of the Holy Roman Empire
1512 establishments in the Holy Roman Empire